Superior is a station on the RTA Red Line in East Cleveland, Ohio. It is located on Superior Avenue (U.S. Route 6) at the intersection of Emily Street, approximately 1½ blocks west of Euclid Avenue (U.S. Route 20). A small parking lot is located northeast of the station entrance along Emily Street.

History
The station opened along with CTS Rapid Transit on March 15, 1955.
It was located across Superior Avenue from the East Cleveland railroad station that served the Nickel Plate and New York Central railroads. The railroad station was constructed in 1929 as part of the Cleveland Union Terminal project, replacing a station located 1 mile southwest at Euclid and East 120th Street. East Cleveland railroad station was abandoned in the 1960s.

The station was completely rehabilitated as part of an RTA renovation program that began in the late 1990s. The $5 million rehabilitation was completed in September 1996.

Station layout

Notable places nearby
 Forest Hill Park

Gallery

References

External links

East Cleveland, Ohio
Red Line (RTA Rapid Transit)
Transportation buildings and structures in Cuyahoga County, Ohio
Railway stations in the United States opened in 1955
1955 establishments in Ohio
Former New York, Chicago and St. Louis Railroad stations
Former New York Central Railroad stations
Former railway stations in Ohio